Toy Story 3 is a 2010 American computer-animated comedy-drama film  produced by Pixar Animation Studios and released by Walt Disney Pictures. It is the third installment in the Toy Story franchise and the sequel to Toy Story 2 (1999). The film was directed by Lee Unkrich from a screenplay he co-wrote with John Lasseter and Andrew Stanton. Toy Story 3 stars the voices of Tom Hanks, Tim Allen, Joan Cusack, Don Rickles, Wallace Shawn, John Ratzenberger, Estelle Harris, Ned Beatty, Michael Keaton, Jodi Benson, and John Morris. In the film, Andy's (Morris) toys are accidentally donated to a daycare center as he prepares to leave for college.

Toy Story 3 debuted at the Taormina Film Fest in Italy on June 12, 2010, and was released in the United States on June 18. Made on a production budget of $200million, Toy Story 3 earned $1.067billion worldwide, finishing its theatrical run as the highest-grossing film of 2010 and the highest-grossing animated film of all time from August 2010 to March 2014. On the review aggregator website Rotten Tomatoes, the film holds an approval rating of  based on  reviews.

The film has received various awards and nominations. It won Best Animated Feature Film at the 68th Golden Globe Awards. The film was nominated for three awards at the 38th Annie Awards. At the 83rd Academy Awards, it received five Oscar nominations, and won for Best Animated Feature and Best Original Song (for "We Belong Together"). Toy Story 3 was named one of the ten best films of 2010 by the National Board of Review (where it also won Best Animated Film) and the American Film Institute. Various critic circles have also picked it as the best animated feature film of the year.

Accolades

See also
 List of accolades received by Toy Story 4

Notes

References

External links
 

Lists of accolades by film
Pixar awards and nominations
Toy Story